Porfiria Sanchíz (1917–1983) was a Spanish film actress.

Selected filmography
 Juan Simón's Daughter (1935)
 Saint Rogelia (1940)
 The Scandal (1943)
 Public Trial (1946)
 Unknown Path (1946)
 Mare Nostrum (1948)
 Black Sky (1951)
 A Tale of Two Villages (1951)
 El Negro que tenía el alma blanca (1951)
 He Died Fifteen Years Ago (1954)
 The Cock Crow (1955)
 Fedra (1956)
 Sonatas (1959)
 A Girl from Chicago (1960)
 The Two Little Rascals (1961)
 The Twin Girls (1963)

References

Bibliography 
 Luis Mariano González. Fascismo, kitsch y cine histórico español, 1939-1953. Univ de Castilla La Mancha, 2009.

External links 
 

1917 births
1983 deaths
Spanish film actresses
People from Cádiz